Grays River may refer to:

Grays River (Washington), a tributary of the lower Columbia River
Grays River, Washington, a census-designated place in Wahkiakum County, Washington
Grays River, New Zealand, a river in New Zealand